Emmy McClelland is a former American Republican politician from Webster Groves, Missouri who served in the Missouri House of Representatives.

Born in Springfield, Missouri, she graduated from University of Missouri with a bachelor's degree in political science.  Her husband was Alan McClelland, a US Navy veteran who died in 2021.

References

20th-century American politicians
21st-century American politicians
20th-century American women politicians
21st-century American women politicians
Republican Party members of the Missouri House of Representatives
Living people
Year of birth missing (living people)
Women state legislators in Missouri
University of Missouri alumni